William Caulfield Raftery (July 28, 1887 – July 2, 1965) was an American football, basketball, and baseball coach.  He was the 17th head football coach at Virginia Military Institute (VMI) located in Lexington, Virginia.  He held that position for ten seasons, from 1927 until 1936.
His career coaching record at VMI was 38–55–5. This ranks him fifth at VMI in total wins and 19th at VMI in winning percentage.

Raftery was born in Worcester, Massachusetts. He studied law at Washington and Lee University in Lexington, Virginia, where played college football as a quarterback in 1912 and 1913. He entered the pharmaceutical business in Ashland, Virginia in 1948, retiring in 1960. Raftery died on July 2, 1965, at his home in Ashland. He was buried in Lexington, Virginia.

Head coaching record

Football

Basketball

References

External links
 

1887 births
1965 deaths
American football quarterbacks
Baseball third basemen
VMI Keydets baseball coaches
VMI Keydets football coaches
VMI Keydets basketball coaches
Washington and Lee Generals baseball coaches
Washington and Lee Generals baseball players
Washington and Lee Generals football coaches
Washington and Lee Generals football players
Washington and Lee Generals men's basketball coaches
People from Ashland, Virginia
Coaches of American football from Massachusetts
Players of American football from Worcester, Massachusetts
Baseball coaches from Massachusetts
Baseball players from Worcester, Massachusetts
Basketball coaches from Massachusetts